The Assistant Secretary of State for Western Hemisphere Affairs is the head of the Bureau of Western Hemisphere Affairs within the United States Department of State, the foreign affairs department of the United States federal government. The Assistant Secretary of State guides operation of the U.S. diplomatic establishment in the countries of the Western Hemisphere and advises the Secretary of State and the Under Secretary for Political Affairs.

The Department of State created the position of Assistant Secretary of State for American Republic Affairs during the general reorganization of December 20, 1944, after Congress had authorized an increase in the number of Assistant Secretaries of State from four to six. This reorganization was the first to assign substantive designations to specific Assistant Secretary positions. The position was temporarily discontinued between June 1947 and June 1949, when American Republic Affairs were handled by an Assistant Secretary for Political Affairs.

The Department re-established the position in June 1949 after the Commission on Organization of the Executive Branch of Government recommended that certain offices be upgraded to bureau level and after Congress increased the number of Assistant Secretaries of State from six to ten. On October 3, 1949, the Department by administrative action changed the incumbent's designation to Assistant Secretary for Inter-American Affairs. The Department of State had first established a Division of Latin American Affairs in 1909.

List of Assistant Secretaries of State for American Republic Affairs, 1944–1947

List of Assistant Secretaries of State for Inter-American Affairs, 1949–2000

List of Assistant Secretaries of State for Western Hemisphere Affairs, 2000–present

References

 
United States–North American relations
United States–Caribbean relations
United States–Central American relations
United States–South American relations
1944 establishments in the United States